K95 or K-95 may refer to:
 K-95 (Kansas highway), a highway in Kansas
 K-95, a rating for ski jumping hills indicating a construction point of 95
 K95 FM, radio sation
 K. 95, a Mozart symphony

See also
K-9 to 5